Ramón María Narváez y Campos, 1st Duke of Valencia (5 August 180023 April 1868) was a Spanish general and statesman who served as Prime Minister on several occasions during the reign of Isabella II. He was also known in Spain as El Espadón de Loja, "The Big Sword of Loja".

Biography
He was born at Loja, Granada,  a son of José María de Narváez y Porcel, 1st Count of Cañada Alta, and wife María Ramona de Campos y Mateos. He entered the army at an early age, and saw active service under Francisco Espoz y Mina in Catalonia in 1822.

He was in his sympathies a Conservative, and could not fully support the Radical opposition to Ferdinand VII, whom he served after his restoration. When the king died in 1833, Narváez became one of the Conservative supporters of Isabel II.

He achieved great popularity by his victory over Miguel Gómez Damas, the Carlist general, at the Battle of Majaceite near Arcos de la Frontera, in November 1836. After clearing La Mancha of brigands by a vigorous policy of suppression in 1838 he was appointed captain-general of Old Castile, and commander-in-chief of the army of reserves.

In 1840, for the part he had taken at Seville in the insurrection against Baldomero Espartero, Count of Luchana and the Progresista party, he was compelled to take refuge in France, where, in conjunction with Maria Cristina, he planned the expedition of 1843 which led to Espartero's overthrow.

On 3 May 1844 Narváez became the 26th prime minister, on 1 July 1844 the 102nd Minister of Foreign Affairs until 21 August 1844, and on 18 November 1845 was created field-marshal and Duque de Valencia, but his policy was too reactionary to be tolerated long, and he was compelled to quit office on 12 February 1846. He then held the post of ambassador at Paris, until again called to preside over the council of ministers as the 28th Prime Minister from 16 March 1846 to 4 April 1846 and 105th Minister of Foreign Affairs from 16 March 1846 to 5 April 1846, and again as the 34th Prime Minister and 111th Minister of Foreign Affairs on 4 October 1847; but misunderstandings with Maria Cristina led to his resignation as Minister on 23 October 1847 and as Prime Minister in the following year on 19 October 1849. On the next day, however, he was recalled as the 36th Prime Minister on 20 October 1849, remaining in office until 10 January 1851.

He was the 58th Grand Cross of the Order of the Tower and Sword in 1848.

His ministry succeeded that of General Leopoldo O'Donnell for a short time as 45th Prime Minister between 12 October 1856 and 15 October 1856, and he again returned to power for a few months as 52nd Prime Minister between 16 September 1864 and 19 May 1865. He once more replaced O'Donnell as the 54th Prime Minister on 11 July 1866, and was still in office when he died at Madrid on 22 April/23 April 1868. On his deathbed, he was asked to forgive his enemies. His answer would become infamous, as he stated "I don't need to forgive my enemies — I have had them all shot."

He married French Marie Alexandrine de Tascher, 369th Dame of the Royal Order of Queen Maria Luisa on 22 July 1844.

He was succeeded in his titles by his nephew, son of his older brother José de Narváez y Campos, 2nd Count of Cañada Alta, and wife and cousin Epifania Porcel y Valdivia, José María de Narváez y Porcel (d. 1890), 2nd Duke of Valencia, 1st Marquess of Oquendo, 3rd Count of Cañada Alta and 2nd Viscount of Aliatar, married to Josefa María del Águila y Cevallos (d. 1888), 13th Marchioness of Espeja, daughter of Luis Ramón del Águila y Alvarado, 12th Marquess of Espeja, and wife Josefa Manuela Petra de Cevallos y Alvarez de Faria (daughter of Pedro de Cevallos y Guerra (1759–1838) and wife Josefa Juana Alvarez de Faria y Sánchez-Zarzosa, maternal aunt of Manuel de Godoy), and had issue.

Honours 
  France: Grand Cross of the Legion of Honour
 : Knight of the Order of St. Andrew
  Spain
 Knight Grand Cross of the Order of Charles III
 Knight Grand Cross of the Royal and Military Order of San Hermenegild
 Knight Grand Cross of the Order of Isabella the Catholic
 Knight of the Order of Alcántara
Knight of the Order of the Golden Fleece

References

Royal Decree of November 18, 1845, on creation of Narváez duque de Valencia

|-

|-

|-

|-

|-

|-

|-

|-

|-

|-

|-

1800 births
1868 deaths
People from the Province of Granada
Field marshals
Foreign ministers of Spain
101
Knights of the Golden Fleece
Spanish captain generals
Spanish generals
Spanish Roman Catholics
People of the Chincha Islands War
Prime Ministers of Spain
Moderate Party (Spain) politicians
19th-century Spanish politicians
Leaders of political parties in Spain